Township 7 is one of five townships in Washington County, Nebraska, United States. The population was 2,562 at the 2000 census. A 2006 estimate placed the township's population at 2,701.

The villages of Arlington, Washington, and a portion of Kennard lie within the Township.

See also
County government in Nebraska

References

Townships in Washington County, Nebraska
Townships in Nebraska